A super-Neptune is a planet that is more massive than the planet Neptune. These planets are generally described as being around 5–7 times as large as Earth with estimated masses of 20–80 ; beyond this they are generally referred to as gas giants. A planet falling within this mass range may also be referred to as a sub-Saturn.

There have been relatively few discoveries of planets of this kind. The mass gap between Neptune-like and Jupiter-like planets is thought to exist because of "runaway accretion" occurring for protoplanets of more than —once this mass threshold is crossed, they accumulate much additional mass (due to gravity increasing with mass and the presence of material in an accretion disk) and grow into planets the size of Jupiter or even larger.

Known examples include Kepler-101b, HAT-P-11b, and K2-33b.

See also

 Super-Earth

References 

Types of planet